Xtravaganza is an adopted surname. Notable people with the surname include:

 Angie Xtravaganza (1964–1993), American performer
 Danni Xtravaganza (1961–1996), American performer
 Venus Xtravaganza (1965–1988), American transgender personality

See also
 House of Xtravaganza